Say It Again may refer to:

 Say It Again (Jermaine Stewart album), 1988
 "Say It Again" (Jermaine Stewart song), 1987
 Say It Again (Stacie Orrico album), an unreleased 2002 album
 "Say It Again" (Don Williams song), 1976
 "Say It Again" (Natasha Bedingfield song), 2007
 "Say It Again" (Marié Digby song), 2008
 "Say It Again" (Precious song), the 1999 United Kingdom entry for the Eurovision Song Contest
 "Say It Again", a song on Santana's 1985 album Beyond Appearances
 "Say It Again", a 1965 single by Terry Black
 Say It Again (film) a 1926 silent Paramount Pictures film starring Richard Dix

See also 

 Say It (disambiguation)